Terrence Trammell (born November 23, 1978) is a retired American track and field athlete who was the silver medalist for the 110 meter hurdles at the 2000 and 2004 Summer Olympics, and three time silver medalist for the World Championships.

He was born to Leonard (Deceased)2010 and Ann Trammell in Atlanta, Georgia. The 1997 Track & Field News Male High School Athlete of the Year, he attended the University of South Carolina where he trained under Curtis Frye. His main training partner until 2002 was Olympic gold medalist Allen Johnson.  He was the 1999-2000 NCAA Champion Indoors and Outdoors.

He qualified for the 2008 Beijing Olympics but had to pull out of the competition after injuring his hamstring in the preliminary rounds. He retired in 2015.

He trained in Atlanta with his high school (Southwest Dekalb High School) coach Napoleon Cobb.

Trammell is a member of Omega Psi Phi fraternity.

He currently serves as an assistant track and field coach at Pace Academy in Atlanta.

In 2021 he was elected into the National Track and Field Hall of Fame.

Personal bests

Achievements

References

External links
 Terrence Trammell at USA Track & Field
 
 
 
 



1978 births
Living people
American male hurdlers
African-American male track and field athletes
Athletes (track and field) at the 2000 Summer Olympics
Athletes (track and field) at the 2004 Summer Olympics
Athletes (track and field) at the 2008 Summer Olympics
Olympic silver medalists for the United States in track and field
World Athletics Championships medalists
World Athletics Indoor Championships medalists
South Carolina Gamecocks men's track and field athletes
Track and field athletes from Atlanta
Medalists at the 2004 Summer Olympics
Medalists at the 2000 Summer Olympics
Universiade medalists in athletics (track and field)
Universiade gold medalists for the United States
USA Indoor Track and Field Championships winners
World Athletics Indoor Championships winners
Medalists at the 1999 Summer Universiade
21st-century African-American sportspeople
20th-century African-American sportspeople